Arun Roy is a Bangladeshi Cinematographer. He won the Bangladesh National Film Award for Best Cinematography three times for the films Bodhu Biday (1978), Johnny (1983) and Bhaijan (1983).

Selected films

Awards and nominations
National Film Awards

References

External links
 

Bangladeshi cinematographers
Best Cinematographer National Film Award (Bangladesh) winners